The 1993-94 Azerbaijan Top League was the third season of the Azerbaijan Top League and was contested by 16 clubs with 2 points awarded for a win, 1 for a draw and no points were awarded for a defeat. Karabakh Agdam were unable to defend their championship, with Turan Tovuz becoming the champions.

Kur changed their name to Kur-Nur, whilst newly promoted Khazri Buzovna became Khazri-Eltadzh Buzavna.

Stadia and locations

Note: Table lists in alphabetical order.

League table

Results

Season statistics

Top scorers

References

External links
1993-94 RSSSF
APL Stats

Azerbaijan Premier League seasons
Azer
1993–94 in Azerbaijani football